The 4th Golden Eagle Awards were held May 9, 1986, in Fuzhou, Fujian province.  Nominees and winners are listed below, winners are in bold.

Best Television Series
not awarded this year
New Star/新星
Four Generations Under One Roof/四世同堂
Finding the Returning World/寻找回来的世界

Best Mini-series
not awarded this year
Poor Street/穷街
Men's Style/男人的风格
Women and War/她们和战争
A Woman Named Xu Xianshu/一个叫许淑娴的人

Best Lead Actor in a Television Series
You Benchang for The Made Monk

Best Lead Actress in a Television Series
Li Weikang for Four Generations Under One Roof

Best Supporting Actor in a Television Series
Xu Jiajun for Finding the Returning World

Best Supporting Actress in a Television Series
Li Wanfen for Four Generations Under One Roof

Best Dubbing Actor
Da Shichang for Rose Strait

Best Dubbing Actress
Zhang Guilai for Father and Daughter

References

External links

1986
1986 in Chinese television
Fuzhou
Mass media in Fujian